Abigail Louise Phillips (born 14 January 1994) is an English actress and singer. She is best known for playing Liberty Savage in Channel 4 soap opera Hollyoaks and for her debut single "Summer Sunshine".

Career

Acting 
Phillips got her big break after writing a song for soap opera Hollyoaks titled "Missing You", which proved popular with viewers when it was featured in the character Steph Cunningham's death scene. Phillips penned the song after being inspired by Steph's cervical cancer storyline and later submitted it to be used on the show. Following the strong response to the track, Hollyoaks bosses arranged a meeting with Phillips and subsequently invited her to audition for the part of Liberty – a musical character they had been developing for some time. She debuted as Liberty at the age of 16 in December 2010. In April 2011, Phillips showcased her vocals as Liberty when the character took part in a karaoke competition giving a show-stopping rendition of Adele's version of Bob Dylan's "Make You Feel My Love".

Music 
In 2011 Abi released her debut single "Summer Sunshine" featuring popular rapper Fugative. The song's music video was uploaded onto YouTube and to date has received almost 400,000 views. As a gesture of goodwill Phillips offered a free sample of a song she recorded called "Somebody Without You". Abi has climbed Mt Snowdon for the checkemlads.com charity which helps young men going through testicular cancer.

Phillips performed her debut single at T4 on the Beach 2011 in which she performed on the sessions stage. The scenes of Phillips' performance aired on Hollyoaks shortly afterwards. At the time Abi also announced to fans on her Twitter account that herself, Jorgie Porter (Theresa McQueen) and Craig Vye (Ethan Scott) also recorded scenes for Hollyoaks at the event.

From the age of 12, Phillips has been a member of the Birmingham pub band Shampoo, which is fronted by hairdresser dad Richard and mum Linda at wedding receptions and clubs. More recently Phillips has toured and fronted premier function band Capital Groove at large corporate events and parties. In September 2014, Phillips sang a show stopping rendition of Sia's 'Titanium' and one of her own songs 'On My Way' at The Pride of Birmingham Awards to over 2,000 people including rock legend Tony Iommi, UB40's Ali Campbell, comedian Jason Manford and footballer Dion Dublin. Phillips continues to perform and write her own material and plans to release her debut EP during 2015. She considers Adele as one of her musical idols. And also cites Wynter Gordon and Ellie Goulding as her musical influences.

Phillips appeared on The Voice UK in 2017 as a contestant, although was unsuccessful in getting a place in the competition.

Personal life 
Phillips was born in the Birmingham town of Sutton Coldfield, to Richard and Linda Phillips. Phillips was a student at Birmingham's Stage Coach performing arts school. She is close friends with her co-stars Hollie Jay Bowes and Tamaryn Payne.

In May 2022 it was revealed that Phillips had been diagnosed with thyroid cancer.

Activism 
In March 2012, Phillips along with some of the Hollyoaks cast and crew successfully completed a sponsored sleep-out in a bid to raise funds for youth homelessness charity Centrepoint. Later in the night, Phillips and Hollie-Jay Bowes provided some musical entertainment. Lights went out in the village at 1am and the challenge was complete when the sun rose just after 6am.

During 201314, Phillips completed a tour of primary schools in the West Midlands in relation to bullying and the effects it has on young people, drawing from past personal experience. Phillips' school campaign achieved national coverage on Television with the BBC, ITV and on radio.

References

External links 

Official website

1994 births
Living people
English women singer-songwriters
English soap opera actresses
People from Birmingham, West Midlands
English child actresses
Child musicians
British contemporary R&B singers
English pop singers
English dance musicians
21st-century English women singers
21st-century English singers